Jaber A. Elbaneh, also known as Gabr al-Bana (born September 9, 1966) is a Yemeni-American who was labeled a suspected terrorist by the United States after it emerged that he had attended the Al Farouq training camp alongside the Lackawanna Six, and remained on at the camp after they returned home. He fled to Yemen, where he worked as a cab driver before turning himself in to authorities.

As Yemeni officials squabbled over his $5 million reward, he escaped in a mass breakout along with a number of other high-profile prisoners, and was added to the FBI Most Wanted Terrorists list. When Yemen convicted him in absentia for conspiracy in a plot against oil facilities, he again turned himself in to the police, and served a 5-year sentence. He is related to Susan Elbaneh, the only American victim of a terrorist attack against the U.S. Embassy in Yemen in September 2008.

Personal Information

Life in the United States
Born in Yemen, Elbaneh lived in the United States, where he maintained a "spotty work history", with his longest stint being at a New York cheese factory. He is married, with seven children.

Elbaneh was closely associated with the Lackawanna Six, a group of American friends living in the suburbs of Buffalo, New York who had attended an Afghan training camp together prior to the outbreak of the War on Terror. When the group went to Galyan's Sporting Goods in Cheektowaga to outfit themselves for the trip, purchasing boots, flashlights, books, diarrhea medication and other essentials, he laughed that he would just add it all onto his credit card account, bringing his total debt to $145,000.

Elbaneh was also indicted in absentia in a federal criminal complaint unsealed on May 21, 2003, in the United States District Court for the Western District of New York, Buffalo, New York. All of them attended get-togethers at the apartment of Kamal Derwish, and Elbaneh and Yahya Goba tended to "compete" for the attention and favour of Derwish, who spoke of his travels abroad and ostensible history fighting in Palestine.

In October, FBI consultant Paul Williams wrote a book Dunces of Doomsday in which he claimed that Adnan Shukrijumah, Amer el-Maati, Elbaneh and Anas al-Liby had all been seen around Hamilton, Ontario the previous year, and that Shukrijumah had been seen at McMaster University where he "wasted no time in gaining access to the nuclear reactor and stealing more than 180 pounds of nuclear material for the creation of radiological bombs". He was subsequently sued by the University for libel, as there had been no evidence to suggest any part of his story was true. The publisher later apologised for allowing Williams to print statements which "were without basis in fact".

By June 2003, Elbaneh had been added to the FBI Seeking Information - Terrorism list.

Arrest and escape
  

Elbaneh worked as a cabbie in San'a for months, before turning himself in to Yemeni authorities. He was sent to a maximum-security prison run by the Political Security Office, while authorities argued with the United States over the substantial $5 million reward, and who should receive it. Some suggested that if they refused to turn Elbaneh over immediately, the United States might increase the reward.

Elbaneh was named as one of 23 people who escaped from a Yemeni jail on February 3, 2006. Prisoners had banned guards from entering the prison basement, as they dug a 143' tunnel using a broomstick and a sharpened spoon, which exited in the women's washroom of a nearby mosque. They had masked the sounds of their escape by playing soccer to distract guards.

The FBI confirmed the escape was genuine on February 23, as they issued a national press release naming Elbaneh as one of the first new additions, since inception in 2001, to the FBI Most Wanted Terrorists list. They also stated that they believed the escaped prisoners, which included Jamal al-Badawi who had a previous successful escape from custody, had likely received help from female sympathisers attending the mosque, who may have helped digging the tunnel from their end.

He is now listed on U.S. Rewards for Justice Program with a $5 million bounty for his capture.

2007 conviction
In 2007, a Yemeni court convicted Elbaneh in absentia for the 2002 oil facilities plot and sentenced him to 10 years imprisonment. In December 2007, Elbaneh surrendered himself, but he was not returned to prison. Reported on May 19, 2008, Elbaneh was jailed in Yemen after an appeals court upheld his 10-year prison sentence.

In November 2008, Yemen's appeal court reduced Elbaneh's sentence from 10 years to 5 because he surrendered to authorities.

See also
 Detroit Sleeper Cell
 Buffalo Six

References

External links

 'Lackawanna Six' Plead Not Guilty, CBS, October 22, 2002
 Final 'Buffalo Six' Member Pleads Guilty, Fox News, May 19, 2003
 Buffalo terror suspect admits al Qaeda training, CNN, May 20, 2003
 Terror-Cell Bail Hearing Continues, Fox News, May 20, 2003
 Frontline: Chasing the Sleeper Cell, PBS
 An interview with Sahim Alwan, PBS, July 24, 2003
 Profiles of members, PBS, October 16, 2003
 2nd member sentenced

1966 births
American escapees
American people imprisoned abroad
American al-Qaeda members
American people of Yemeni descent
Buffalo Six
Escapees from Yemeni detention
FBI Most Wanted Terrorists
Living people
Yemeni al-Qaeda members
Yemeni escapees
Yemeni emigrants to the United States